Nahid Iskander Mirza (6 February 1919 – 23 January 2019), born Nahid Amir Teymour (previously Nahid Afghamy), was an Iranian-Pakistani socialite who was the first lady of Pakistan between 1956 and 1958  and a distant relative of another first lady of Pakistan, Nusrat Bhutto.

Personal life
Nahid was the daughter of Aristocrat Amirteymour Kalali, and the granddaughter of Mir 'Ali Mardan Shah, Nuzrat ol-Molk and his wife Princess Ashraf us-Sultana. 

Nahid was first married to an Iranian Lieutenant Colonel Afghamy, a then military-attaché at the Iranian Embassy in Pakistan. At the same time, Iskander Mirza was the secretary of the Defense Ministry in Pakistan. During an event at the Russian embassy in Karachi, she met Iskandar Mirza for the first time. 

In 1952, the Afghamys left Pakistan for Tehran again. And Nahid joined her daughter in London, who at the time was to enter a boarding school in the town. In December 1953 she divorced Afghamy and in September 1954 she married Mirza who had lost his wife and son in a plane crash. 

According to Pakistan Today, she played a major role in the resolution of the border dispute between Pakistan and Iran about Mirjaveh. In 1956, Iskander Mirza became the President of Pakistan and she became the First Lady of Pakistan Following the military coup in Pakistan in 1958, the Mirzas were exiled to London where they lived at South Kensington. Iskander died in November 1969. She died in London on 23 January 2019.

References

1919 births
2019 deaths
Place of birth missing
Iranian emigrants to Pakistan
Pakistani people of Kurdish descent
Pakistani socialites
Spouses of presidents of Pakistan
Iranian Kurdish women
Naturalised citizens of Pakistan
Spouses of prime ministers of Pakistan
Iranian expatriates in the United Kingdom